Jahirsino Julio Baylón Yglesias (born 26 February 1989), commonly known as Jair Baylón, is a Peruvian footballer who plays as a forward for Sport Chavelines Juniors. He is also the son of Julio Baylón.

Club career
Jairzinho Baylón was born in Lima, Peru on February 26, 1989, where he started playing Football just when he started walking as a child in the streets of Lima with local school boys. His family quickly put him into Alianza Lima's youth academy where he excelled through the ranks, and after just one season he then signed for Portuguese Liga club SC Braga.

SC Braga manager Jorge Costa said that the youngster is part of his plans to launch an assault on the UEFA Cup, in which Baylón will be playing for with the club.

He admits after his father's death he became more interested in football, saying he would push himself at the extremes, and he also stated that since his father died he has seen football as a way to be connected to his father.

Baylón made his professional debut for Alianza Lima on 30 March 2008.

In 2019, Baylon joined Sport Chavelines Juniors.

References

External links

1989 births
Living people
Footballers from Lima
Association football forwards
Peruvian footballers
Club Alianza Lima footballers
S.C. Braga players
Gil Vicente F.C. players
Club Deportivo Universidad de San Martín de Porres players
El Tanque Sisley players
Sport Boys footballers
Sport Huancayo footballers
Club Universitario de Deportes footballers
Unión Comercio footballers
Real Garcilaso footballers
Universidad Técnica de Cajamarca footballers
Alianza Atlético footballers
Club Deportivo Universidad César Vallejo footballers
Academia Deportiva Cantolao players
Peruvian Primera División players
Peruvian expatriate footballers
Peruvian expatriate sportspeople in Portugal
Peruvian expatriate sportspeople in Uruguay
Expatriate footballers in Portugal
Expatriate footballers in Uruguay